Gerhard Richard Lomer (1882–1970) was a librarian, editor, and writer. He was the librarian for McGill University Library from 1920 until 1947 and established the university's graduate level library school. He wrote for reference works including The Warner Library and Allen Johnson's series Chronicles of America. He also edited books by prominent authors of his day including John Moody, the founder of Moody's.

Lomer was born in Montréal on 6 March 1882 to Adolph Henry Lomer, an insurance broker, and Ellen Adèle LaFleur. His grandfather was Gerhard Friedrich Lomer (1819–1895), a furrier in Montreal, New York and Leipzig, was president of German Society of Montreal from 1860 until 1865. Lomer was baptised at l'Oratoire French Baptist church and his godparents were Richard and Alma Lomer.

He graduated McGill with a B.A. in 1903. From 1903 until 1907 he taught English and Education at McGill. He received a Ph.D. in education from Columbia University in 1910. In 1920, he was appointed McGill University's Librarian, a position he remained at until his retirement in 1948.

In 1927, he established McGill's Library School as a full graduate course from what had been a summer program. He was Director and Professor of Library Administration from 1927 until 1947 and also served as associate director of the University of Ottawa's Library School. He was president of the Quebec Library Association from 1932 until 1933 and became an honorary life president in 1937.

He wrote about literature for The Warner Library, a reference book and digest of world literature including entries on the study of literature.

Bibliography
The concept of method
Writing Of Today: Models Of Journalistic Prose with John William Cunliffe
Elizabethan Sea-Dogs: A Chronicle of Drake & His Companions (1918) by William Charles Henry Wood,  Allen Johnson (editor), Gerhard Richard Lomer (editor)
The Red Man's Continent: A Chronicle of Aboriginal America (1918) by Ellsworth Huntington,  Allen Johnson (editor), Gerhard Richard Lomer (editor) 
The New South (1919) by Holland Thompson,  Gerhard Richard Lomer (editor) 
The Chronicles of America Series (1919) (co-author)
Stephen Leacock entry about Stephen Leacock
The Study and Practice of Writing English entry
The Masters of Capital (1919) by John Moody, Gerhard Richard Lomer (editor)
Correspondence with Allen Johnson, relating to the Chronicles of America Series (1907-1920) letters to various scholars including Romer regarding 	 editorship of the Chronicles of America Series

References

External links
 Gerhard Richard Lomer biography at Ex Libris Association

1882 births
1970 deaths
American librarians
McGill University alumni
Academic staff of McGill University
Teachers College, Columbia University alumni
Canadian librarians